Den Brother is a 2010 Disney Channel Original Movie starring Hutch Dano and G Hannelius. The film premiered on August 13, 2010 on Disney Channel.

Plot
Alex Pearson (Hutch Dano) is a self-absorbed, but avid Lemon Oaks High School hockey player who is seeking the attention of Matisse Burrows (Kelsey Chow), the most beautiful girl in school. Alex also wants a car, but his widowed father Jasper refuses to help financially, stating that Alex's "attitude" needs to improve, citing Alex's recent suspension from the hockey team for showboating; Alex also wants a spot on the All-Stars hockey team, but his tendency to showboat prevents him from getting on. In order to become more creditable with his father, Alex has to do chores and babysit his little sister, Emily (G. Hannelius). Meanwhile, the leader of Emily's Bumble Bee troop has just been informed her husband got a great job offer in another part of the country, and hastily leaves without arranging for a successor, which the girls worry their troop will be dissolved. Alex tells the girls he will be the substitute scoutmaster, and he uses the alias of "Mrs. Zamboni" to fool parents and the Bumblebee council.

The Bumble Bee troop has to work to be able to attend the Camporee, the most important Bumble Bee event of the year, by selling cookies and completing various badges. Alex helps the girls earn the badges, and they in turn help him get a date with Matisse, who is a senior Bumble Bee. At the same time, he also stands up for the other Den Mothers to Dina (Vicki Lewis), a very controlling Den Mother.

Alex accidentally reveals himself when, during a muffin sale at the big hockey game, the coach wonders where Alex is as his suspension is over. Alex puts himself in, still disguised as Mrs. Zamboni, to win the game. However, his actions disqualifies his troop, alienates his best friend, and disappoints his sister and father. Afterwards, Emily refuses to talk to him and his father refuses to punish him, knowing that Alex will punish himself. After returning a runaway dog to one of his neighbors, Mrs. Jacklitts, Alex learns that she used to be a Bumble Bee leader herself. Alex's mother, who died two years ago, had been a Bumble Bee in Mrs. Jacklitt's old troop.

Upon learning this, Alex makes a deal with her to help out around the house in exchange for her being the new Den Mother. After introducing her to the troop, she convinces them to forgive Alex, who goes to the finals for his hockey game. There, he apologizes to his team and offers the captaincy to Goose (David Lambert), who refuses, saying he wants Alex to be the real captain. During the game, Alex acts as a distraction instead of hogging the puck to himself, allowing his team to win. Alex clears the way for Goose to make the winning point, causing Goose to get the All-Star spot Alex wanted. The Bumble Bees show up with Alex's father; Matisse forgives Alex and reveals that they want Alex to be their Den Mother, to which Alex accepts.

At the Camporee, Alex claims he is the Den Mother. Dina disapproves and tries to get Alex to quit saying all Den Mothers must be in a Bumble Bee uniform, which Alex is not. Not wanting to let his troop down, Alex puts on a Bumble Bee uniform. Dina is infuriated and asks her husband (the hockey official who originally suspended Alex), to do something about it. However, he is pleased with Alex's attitude and offers him a spot on the All-Stars. Alex gleefully accepts as long as it works around his troop's schedule.

Cast
 Hutch Dano as Alex Pearson
 G. Hannelius as Emily Pearson
 Taylar Hender as Abigail
 Vicki Lewis as Dina Reams
 Kelsey Chow as Matisse Burrows
 David Lambert as Danny "Goose" Gustavo
 Kelly Gould as Rachel
 Kiara Muhammad as Ursula
 Haley Tju as Tina
 Maurice Godin as Jasper Pearson
 Debra Mooney as Allie Jacklitz
 Rick Dano (real-life father of Hutch Dano) makes a cameo as Delivery Man

Production
The film was shot in early 2010 on location in Salt Lake City, Utah.

Reception
The movie premiere generated 3.7 million viewers. The film grew its audience from the beginning with 3.08 million viewers to eventually peaked with 4.3 million viewers  in its final quarter-hour; it also topped its  premiere night.

References

External links

 

2010 television films
2010 films
Disney Channel Original Movie films
American ice hockey films
American teen comedy films
American teen romance films
Scouting in popular culture
Cross-dressing in American films
Films shot in Utah
American teen films
2010s English-language films
2010s American films